James Owen (birth unknown – death unknown) was an English professional rugby league footballer who played in the 1920s.

Playing career

International honours
Jim Owen won caps for England while at St. Helens Recs in 1921 against Wales, Other Nationalities, and Australia, in 1923 against Wales (2 matches), and won a cap for Great Britain while at St. Helens Recs in 1922 against Australia.

County Cup Final appearances
Jim Owen played right-, i.e. number 3, in St. Helens Recs' 17-0 victory over Swinton in the 1923 Lancashire County Cup Final during the 1923–24 season at Central Park, Wigan on Saturday 24 November 1923.

References

England national rugby league team players
English rugby league players
Great Britain national rugby league team players
Place of birth missing
Place of death missing
Rugby league centres
Rugby league wingers
St Helens Recreation RLFC players
Year of birth missing
1947 deaths